Travis Livermon (born April 2, 1988) is an American cyclist, who most recently rode for American amateur team Endurance Collective.

References

External links

1988 births
American male cyclists
Living people
Cyclo-cross cyclists